La Liberté is a Swiss-French newspaper based in Fribourg founded in 1871.

References

Publications established in 1871
French-language newspapers published in Switzerland